Ads Up Canada (full name Ads Up Canada Refugee Network) is a Toronto-based not for profit organization that helps refugees move from Australian offshore detention facilities to Canada.

Nomenclature 
Ads Up is an contraction of Australian Diaspora Steps Up.

Organization 
Ads Up Canada was established in 2019 and was formally registered in 2020.

It has a specific focus to help refugees detained on Manus Island and Nauru.

It is supported by the Government of Canada.

Activities 
Ads Up Canada collaborates with MOSAIC and the Refugee Council of Australia on Operation #NotForgotten a program to use Canada's private sponsorship of refugees program to help move refugees from detention centers in Australia to Canada.

See also 
 Pacific solution

References

External link 

 Official website

Refugee aid organizations in Canada
Organizations based in Toronto
Organizations established in 2019
Non-governmental organizations
Humanitarian aid organizations
2019 establishments in Canada